The Housing Act 1933 is an Act of Parliament in the United Kingdom. It ended subsidies for general housing, that were present in the Housing Act 1930 (Greenwood Act) authorities were required to concentrate their efforts on slum clearance.

References

United Kingdom Acts of Parliament 1933
Housing legislation in the United Kingdom
Slum clearance